Cary Barlowe (born 1982) is an American country music songwriter, and a former member of the rock band Luna Halo.

Born in Virginia and raised in North Carolina, Barlowe originally performed with his older brother Nathan in the rock group Luna Halo in addition to signing a publishing contract with TobyMac. After leaving Luna Halo, Barlowe began working as a country music songwriter, writing for Major Bob Music. His first song in the country genre was "Untouchable" by Taylor Swift on her multi-platinum album, Fearless. His songs include "American Honey" by Lady Antebellum, "Make a Life, Not a Living by Brett Kissel, "Where It's At" by Dustin Lynch, and "Sun Daze" by Florida Georgia Line. He has songs with Billy Currington, Dierks Bentley, Carrie Underwood, Little Big Town and Gary Allan. Barlowe is also a three-time Grammy nominee.

Songs written

Accolades

References

1982 births
American country songwriters
American male songwriters
Living people
Musicians from Lynchburg, Virginia
Songwriters from Virginia
Songwriters from North Carolina